Thelma Somerville Cudlipp (14 October 1891 – 2 April 1983) was an American artist and book illustrator.

Early life
Thelma was born in Richmond, Virginia on 14 October 1891. She was the daughter of Frederick Dallas Cudlipp and Annie (née Ericsson) Cudlipp. Her mother died in Bermuda on 24 June 1915.

After her father died in Virginia in 1903, then in her teens, she came to New York City to study art. Her mother was an assistant editor on The Delineator in 1909 when Theodore Dreiser was managing editor.  Dreiser became infatuated with Thelma, but her mother was strongly opposed to Dreiser's involvement with her daughter, Thelma's mother succeeded in breaking up the relationship by sending Thelma to England and by reporting it to the directors of the Butterick Publishing Company, which cost Dreiser his job.

Artistic career

In England, Cudlipp continued her training in art, winning but not accepting a Royal Academy scholarship. When she returned to the U.S., she took lessons from Kenneth Hayes Miller, one of Dreiser's friends.  She became well known as an illustrator for various newspapers and magazines, such as Harper's, The Century Magazine, McClure's, and The Saturday Evening Post. In addition to her own work, she developed an interest in pre-Columbian sculpture, which she collected and promoted through lectures. She later developed a friendship with Dreiser, but it was not of a romantic nature. They exchanged letters with each other until Dreiser's death.

In 1932, Thelma had an exhibition of her paintings at the Marie Sterner Galleries. In 1933, she was "declared the winner of the popular prize of $25" for her painting, entitled Victorian Place, in the annual exhibition of the Newport Art Association.

Personal life
In 1918, she married Edwin Prescott Grosvenor (1875–1930), a successful attorney with Cadwalader, Wickersham & Taft, and cousin of former president William Howard Taft.  Edwin was the son of Edwin A. Grosvenor and brother of Gilbert Hovey Grosvenor, who married Elsie May Bell (daughter of Alexander Graham Bell). Together, they were the parents of two daughters: Anne Somerville Grosvenor (1919–2001), who married Dwight Edwards Robinson Jr. in 1945., and Louise Taft Grosvenor (1921–1987), who married Montana politician Sumner Gerard.

After her husband's death in 1930, she married Charles Seymour Whitman in 1933. Whitman had been governor of New York from 1915 to 1918. He died in 1947.

She died on 2 April 1983 in Greenwich, Connecticut. She was buried at Washington Cemetery on the Green in Litchfield County, Connecticut.

References

External links

 

1892 births
1983 deaths
American women illustrators
American illustrators
Artists from Richmond, Virginia
20th-century American women artists